The Life of Muhammad is a 2011 British three-part documentary miniseries examining the life of the Islamic prophet Muhammad and the origins of Islam. The documentary was directed by Faris Kermani, written by Ziauddin Sardar, and presented by Rageh Omaar. It was broadcast by BBC Two over three consecutive weeks from 11 July 2011 to 25 July 2011.

Awards and nominations

See also
 List of Islamic films
Muhammad in film

References

External links
 

Crescent Films website

2010s British documentary television series
2011 British television series debuts
2011 British television series endings
English-language television shows
2011 in Islam
BBC television documentaries about medieval history